Carex cespitosa (Tuft carex) is a species of perennial sedge of the genus Carex which can be found growing in tufts (caespitose), as the Latin specific epithet  suggests. The name is synonymous with Carex cespitosa f. retorta.

The species can be found in all of Scandinavia, ranging from common to rare, and central parts of Europe, becoming rare to the west and towards the Mediterranean, and including isolated locations in Great Britain and the Iberian Peninsula.

The species is often found in a mosaic with other Carex, but can become almost entirely dominant. It grows in very moist soil.

References

cespitosa
Flora of Europe
Flora of Asia
Plants described in 1753
Taxa named by Carl Linnaeus